Prophets in Islam are individuals in Islam who are believed to spread God's message on Earth and to serve as models of ideal human behaviour. Some prophets are categorized as messengers (sing.), those who transmit divine revelation, most of them through the interaction of an angel. Muslims believe that many prophets existed, including many not mentioned in the Quran. The Quran states: "And for every community there is a messenger." Belief in the Islamic prophets is one of the six articles of the Islamic faith.

Muslims believe that the first prophet was also the first human being, Adam, created by God. Many of the revelations delivered by the 48 prophets in Judaism and many prophets of Christianity are mentioned as such in the Quran but usually with Arabic versions of their names; for example, the Jewish Elisha is called Alyasa', Job is Ayyub, Jesus is 'Isa, etc. The Torah given to Moses (Musa) is called Tawrat, the Psalms given to David (Dawud) is the Zabur, the Gospel given to Jesus is Injil.

The last prophet in Islam is Muhammad ibn ʿAbdullāh, whom Muslims believe to be the "Seal of the Prophets" (Khatam an-Nabiyyin), to whom the Quran was revealed in a series of revelations (and written down by his companions). Muslims believe the Quran is the divine word of God, thus immutable and protected from distortion and corruption, destined to remain in its true form until the Last Day.

In Islam, every prophet preached the same core beliefs: the Oneness of God, worshipping of that one God, avoidance of idolatry and sin, and the belief in the Day of Resurrection or the Day of Judgement and life after death. Prophets and messengers are believed to have been sent by God to different communities during different times in history.

Etymology

Terminology in the Bible and its apocrypha 
The words "prophet" and "messenger" appear several times in the Old Testament and the New Testament. The Biblical Hebrew word nabi ("spokesperson, prophet") occurs often in the Hebrew Bible. The biblical word for "messenger", mal'akh, refers today to Angels in Judaism, but originally was used for human messenger both of God and of men, thus it is only somewhat comparable to rasūl. According to Judaism, Haggai, Zaqariah, and Malachi were the last prophets, all of whom lived at the end of the 70-year Babylonian exile. With them, the authentic period of Nevuah ("prophecy") died, and nowadays only the "Bath Kol" ("voice of God") exists (Sanhedrin 11a).

In the New Testament, however, the word "messenger" becomes more frequent, sometimes in association with the concept of a preacher (apostle or prophet). "Messenger" may refer to Jesus, to his Apostles and to John the Baptist. But the last book of the Old Testament, the Book of Malachi, speaks of a messenger that Christian commentators interpret as a reference to the future prophet John the Baptist (Yahya).

The Syriac form of rasūl Allāh, s̲h̲eliḥeh d-allāhā, occurs frequently in the apocryphal Acts of St. Thomas. The corresponding verb for s̲h̲eliḥeh—s̲h̲alaḥ, occurs in connection with the prophets in the Hebrew Bible.

Terminology in the Quran 
In Arabic, the term nabī (Arabic plural form:) means "prophet". Forms of this noun occur 75 times in the Quran. The term nubuwwah ( "prophethood") occurs five times in the Quran.

The following table shows these words in different languages:

Characteristics 

In Islam, the Quran is believed to be a revelation from the last prophet in the Abrahamic succession, Muhammad, and its contents detail what Muslims refer to as the straight path. According to Islamic belief, every prophet preached submission and obedience to God (Islam). There is an emphasis on charity, prayer, pilgrimage, fasting, with the most emphasis given to the strict belief and worship of a singular God. The Quran itself calls Islam the "religion of Abraham" (Ibrahim) and refers to Jacob (Yaqub) and the Twelve Tribes of Israel as being Muslims.

The Quran says:
Prophets in Islam are exemplars to ordinary humans. They exhibit model characteristics of righteousness and moral conduct. Prophetic typologies shared by all prophets include prophetic lineage, advocating monotheism, transmitting God's messages, and warning of the eschatological consequences of rejecting God. Prophetic revelation often comes in the form of signs and divine proofs. Each prophet is connected to one another, and ultimately support the final prophetic message of Muhammad. The qualities prophets possess are meant to lead people towards the straight path.  In one hadith, it was stated: "Among men the prophets suffer most."

Protection from sin and failure 

Classical Islamic teaching, especially Shia Islam, teach that unlike other human beings, prophets have the quality of ʿiṣmah, i.e., are protected by God from making mistakes or committing grave sins.  This does not mean that they do not err, rather that they always seek to correct their mistakes. It is argued that sins are necessary for prophets, so they can show the people how to repent.

Some doubt whether there is Quranic basis for ʿiṣmah, but the notion became "mainstream Sunni doctrine" by the ninth century CE. 

The Quran speaks of the prophets as being the greatest human beings of all time. Quran 4:69 lists various virtuous groups of human beings, among whom prophets (including messengers) occupy the highest rank. Verse 4:69 reads:

Stories of the prophets in the Quran demonstrate that it is "God's practice" (Sunnat Allah) to make faith triumph finally over the forces of evil and adversity. "We have made the evil ones friends to those without faith." "Assuredly God will defend those who believe." The prophets are divinely inspired by God but "share no divine attributes", and possess "no knowledge or power" other than that granted to them by God. Prophets are considered to be chosen by God for the specific task of teaching the faith of Islam.
Age
Some were called to prophesy late in life, such as Muhammad at the age of 40. Some were called to prophesy at a young age, such as John the Baptist. Jesus prophesied while still in his cradle.

Female prophets 
The Tawrat (the Arabic-language name for the Torah within its context as an Islamic holy book) mentions that Deborah was a prophetess as well as the fourth Judge of pre-monarchic Israel.

The question of Mary's prophethood has been debated amongst Muslim theologians. The Zahirite ("literalist") school argued that Mary as well as Sara the mother of Isaac, and Asiya, the mother of Moses are not considered as prophets. The Zahirites-based this determination on the instances in the Quran where angels spoke to the women and divinely guided their actions. According to the Zahirite Ibn Hazm of Cordova (d. 1064) women could be placed under the categorization of nubuwwa ("prophethood") but not under risala ("messengerhood") which could only be attained by men. Ibn Hazm also based his position on Mary's prophethood on Qurān 5:75 which refers to Mary as "a woman of truth" just as it refers to Joseph as a "man of truth" in Q12:46. Other linguistic examples which augment scholarship around Mary's position in Islam can be found in terms used to describe her. For example, In Q4:34 Mary is described as being one of the "qanitin", or one who exhibits "qunut" ("devout obedience"). This is the same term used for male prophets in the masculine gender plural of Arabic. The feminine plural, which is not used, would be "qanitat".

Challenges to Mary's prophethood have often been based on Q12:109 which reads "We have only sent men prior to you". Some scholars have argued that the use of the term "rijal" or men should be interpreted as providing a contrast between men and angels and not necessarily as contrasting men and women.

The majority of scholars, particularly in the Sunni tradition, have rejected this doctrine as bid'a ("heretical innovation").

Prophetic lineage 
Abraham is widely recognized for being the father of monotheism in the Abrahamic religions, however, in the Quran he is recognized as a messenger and a link in the chain of Muslim prophets. Muhammad, God's final messenger and the revelator of the Quran, is a descendant of Abraham. In the Quran it reads, "He [God] said: 'I am making you [Abraham] a spiritual exemplar to mankind.'" (Q. 2:124) This phrase is affirming Islam as an Abrahamic religion, and further promoting Abraham as an important figure in the history of the Quran. This confirmation of the prophetic relationship (between Abraham and Muhammad) is significant to Abraham's story in the Quran – due to the fact that the last messenger, Muhammad, completes Abraham's prophetic lineage. This relationship can be seen in the Quranic chapter 6:

"That is Our Argument which We imparted to Abraham against his people. We raise up in degrees whomever We please. Your Lord is indeed Wise, All-Knowing. And We granted him Isaac and Jacob, and guided each of them; and Noah We guided before that, and of his progeny, [We guided] David, Solomon, Job, Joseph, Moses and Aaron. Thus We reward the beneficent. And Zechariah, John, Jesus and Elias, each was one of the righteous. And Ishmael, Elijah, Jonah and Lot; each We exalted above the whole world. [We also exalted some] of their fathers, progeny and brethren. And We chose them and guided them to a straight path." (Q. 6:83-87)

These particular verses support the Quranic narrative for Abraham to be recognized as a patriarch and is supported by his prophetic lineage concluding with Muhammad. Although Muhammad is considered the last prophet, some Muslim traditions also recognize and venerate saints (though modern schools, such as Salafism and Wahhabism, reject the theory of sainthood).

The Quran presents the world of Abraham as interlocking dramas or conflicts. The divine drama concerns the events of creation and banishment from the garden; while the human drama concerns the life and history of humanity but, also inclusive of the ever-changing events in of individual lives and those of the prophets. This is the situation that calls the faith of the Prophets to follow and reclaim the message of the Straight path and this is characterization of the conflicts between the two dramas. The Islamic morality is founded on this virtuous living through faith in the life ordained by the divine. This is the divine task given to believers accompanied by the divine gift that the Prophets had in revelation and perspective of ayat. This the key feature to the authority of their revelation because not only is the source of revelation is God but it produces texts that are seen as distinctive than other poetry but it fits within the Abrahamic tradition. Poetry especially, in the Arabian context, connects the Quran to Pre-Islamic poetry which originates from the jihn; however, the Quran's place within other religious contexts gives the revelation to Muhammed the same authority of the Hebrew texts and the New Testament.

Monotheism 
The Quran states,

"And (remember) Abraham, when he said to his people: 'Worship Allah and fear Him; that is far better for you, if only you knew. Indeed, you only worship, apart from Allah, mere idols, and you invent falsehood. Surely, those you worship, apart from Allah, have no power to provide for you. So, seek provision from Allah, worship Him and give Him thanks. You shall be returned unto Him.'" (Q. 29:16-17)

This passage promotes Abraham's devotion to God as one of his messengers along with his monotheism. Islam is a monotheistic religion, and Abraham is one who is recognized for this transformation of the religious tradition. This prophetic aspect of monotheism is mentioned several times in the Quran. Abraham believed in one true God (Allah) and promoted an "invisible oneness" (tawḥīd) with him. The Quran proclaims, "Say: 'My lord has guided me to a Straight Path, a right religion, the creed of Abraham, an upright man who was no polytheist.'" (Q. 6:161) One push Abraham had to devote himself to God and monotheism is from the pagans of his time. Abraham was devoted to cleansing the Arabian Peninsula of this impetuous worship. His father was a wood idol sculptor, and Abraham was critical of his trade. Due to Abraham's devotion, he is recognized as the father of monotheism.

Eschatology 
Prophets and messengers in Islam often fall under the typologies of nadhir ("warner") and bashir ("announcer of good tidings"). Many prophets serve as vessels to inform humanity of the eschatological consequences of not accepting God's message and affirming monotheism. A verse from the Quran reads: "Verily, We have sent thee [Muhammad] with the truth, as a bearer of glad tidings and a warner: and thou shalt not be held accountable for those who are destined for the blazing fire." (Q2:119) The prophetic revelations found in the Quran offer vivid descriptions of the flames of Hell that await nonbelievers but also describe the rewards of the gardens of Paradise that await the true believers. The warnings and promises transmitted by God through the prophets to their communities serve to legitimize Muhammed's message. The final revelation that is presented to Muhammed is particularly grounded in the belief that the Day of Judgement is imminent.

Signs and divine proofs 
Throughout the Quran, prophets such as Moses and Jesus often perform miracles or are associated with miraculous events. The Quran makes clear that these events always occur through God and not of the prophet's own volition. Throughout the Meccan passages there are instances where the Meccan people demand visual proofs of Muhammad's divine connection to God to which Muhammad replies "The signs are only with Allah, and I am only a plain warner." (Q29:50) This instance makes clear that prophets are only mortals who can testify to God's omnipotence and produce signs when he wills it. Furthermore, the Quran states that visual and verbal proofs are often rejected by the unbelievers as being sihr ("magic") The Quran reads: "They claim that he tries to bewitch them and make them believe that he speaks the word of God, although he is just an ordinary human being like themselves. (Q74:24-25)

Representation and prophetic connection to Muhammad 
There are patterns of representation of Quranic prophecy that support the revelation of Muhammad. Since Muhammad is in Abraham's prophetic lineage, they are analogous in many aspects of their prophecy. Muhammad was trying to rid the Pagans of idolatry during his lifetime, which is similar to Abraham. This caused many to reject Muhammad’s message and even made him flee from Mecca due to his unsafety in the city. Carl Ernest, the author of How to Read the Qur’an: A New Guide, with Select Translations, states, "The Qur’an frequently consoles Muhammad and defends him against his opponents." This consolation can also be seen as parallel to Abraham's encouragement from God. Muhammad is also known to perform miracles as Abraham did. Sura 17 (al-isrā) briefly describes Muhammad's miraculous Night Journey where he physically ascended to the Heavens to meet with previous prophets. This spiritual journey is significant in the sense that many Islamic religious traditions and transformations were given and established during this miracle, such as the ritual of daily prayer. (Q17:78-84) Muhammad is a descendant of Abraham; therefore, this not only makes him part of the prophetic lineage, but the final prophet in the Abrahamic lineage to guide humanity to the Straight Path. In Sura 33 (al-ahzāb) it confirms Muhammad and states, "Muhammad is not the father of any of your men, but is the Messenger of Allah and the seal of the Prophets. Allah is Cognizant of everything". (Q33:40)

Obedience 
The Quran emphasizes the importance of obedience to prophets in Surah 26 Ash-Shu'ara, in which a series of prophets preaching fear of God and obedience to themselves.
verse 108 has Noah saying 'fear God and Obey me'
verse 126 has Hud saying 'fear God and obey me'
verse 144 has Salih saying 'fear God and obey me'
verse 163 has Lot saying 'fear God and obey me'
verse 179 has Shu'ayb saying 'fear God and obey me'

Scriptures and other gifts

Holy books of Islam 

The revealed books are the records which Muslims believe were dictated by God to various Islamic prophets throughout the history of mankind, all these books promulgated the code and laws of Islam. The belief in all the revealed books is an article of faith in Islam and Muslims must believe in all the scriptures to be a Muslim. Islam speaks of respecting all the previous scriptures.

The Quran mentions some Islamic scriptures by name:

 The "Tawrat" (also Tawrah or Taurat) is the Arabic name for the Torah within its context as an Islamic holy book believed by Muslims to have been revealed to the prophets and messengers amongst the Children of Israel. When referring to traditions from the Tawrat, Muslims have not only identified it with the Pentateuch, but also with the other books of the Hebrew Bible as well as with Talmudic and Midrashim writings.
The Quran mentions the Zabur,  interpreted as being the Book of Psalms, as being the holy scripture revealed to King David (Dawud). Scholars have often understood the Psalms to have been holy songs of praise, and not a book administering law.
 Books of Divine Wisdom (Arabic: possibly identified as الْزُبُر az-Zubur): The Quran mentions certain Books of Divine Wisdom, translated by some scholars as Books of Dark Prophecies, which are a reference to particular books vouchsafed to some prophets, wherein there was wisdom for man. Some scholars have suggested that these may be one and the same as the Psalms as their root Arabic word, Zubur (Quran 35:25) - the plural for the word "Scriptures", comes from the same source as the Arabic Zabur for the Psalms.
The Injil (Gospel) was the holy book revealed to Jesus, according to the Quran. Although many lay Muslims believe the Injil refers to the entire New Testament, scholars have clearly pointed out that it refers not to the New Testament but to an original Gospel, which was sent by God, and was given to Jesus. Therefore, according to Muslim belief, the Gospel was the message that Jesus, being divinely inspired, preached to the Children of Israel. The current canonical Gospels, in the belief of Muslim scholars, are not divinely revealed but rather are documents of the life of Jesus, as written by various contemporaries, disciples and companions. These Gospels contain portions of Jesus's teachings but do not represent the original Gospel, which was a single book written not by a human but was sent by God.
Quran: The Quran was the revelation revealed to Muhammad.
Scrolls of Abraham (Arabic: صحف إبراهيم‎, Ṣuḥuf ʾIbrāhīm) are believed to have been one of the earliest bodies of scripture, which were given to Abraham (Ibrāhīm), and later used by Ishmael (Ismā‘īl) and Isaac (Isḥāq). Although usually referred to as "scrolls", many translators have translated the Arabic suhuf as "books". The verse mentioning the "Scriptures" is in Quran 87:18-19 where they are referred to, alongside the Scrolls of Moses, to have been "Books of Earlier Revelation".
Scrolls of Moses (Ṣuḥuf Mūsā) are an ancient body of scripture mentioned twice in the Quran. They are part of the religious scriptures of Islam. Jordanian scholar and professor of philosophy Ghazi bin Muhammad mentions that the "Scrolls of Moses" are identical to the Torah of Moses. 
Book of Enlightenment: The Quran mentions a Book of Enlightenment, which has alternatively been translated as Scripture of Enlightenment or the Illuminating Book.

Holy gifts 

Muhammad was given a divine gift of revelation through the angel Gabriel. This direct communication with the divine underlines the human experience but the message of the Quran dignifies this history of revelation with these select people in human history the foundation for Muhammed's prophetic lineage.

The Quran mentions various divinely-bestowed gifts given to various prophets. These may be interpreted as books or forms of celestial knowledge. Although all prophets are believed by Muslims to have been immensely gifted, special mention of "wisdom" or "knowledge" for a particular prophet is understood to mean that some secret knowledge was revealed to him. The Quran mentions that Abraham prayed for wisdom and later received it. It also mentions that Joseph and Moses both attained wisdom when they reached full age; David received wisdom with kingship, after slaying Goliath; Lot (Lut) received wisdom whilst prophesying in Sodom and Gomorrah; John the Baptist received wisdom while still a mere youth; and Jesus received wisdom and was vouchsafed the Gospel.

The nature of revelation 
During the time of Muhammad's revelation, the Arabian peninsula was made up of many pagan tribes. His birthplace, Mecca, was a central pilgrimage site and a trading center where many tribes and religions were in constant contact. Muhammad's connection with the surrounding culture was foundational to the way the Quran was revealed. Though it is seen as the direct word of God, it came through to Muhammad in his own native language of Arabic, which could be understood by all the peoples in the peninsula. This is the key feature of the Quran which makes it unique to the poetry and other religious texts of the time. It is considered immune to translation and culturally applicable to the context of the time it was revealed. Muhammad was criticized for his revelation being poetry which, according to the cultural perspective, is revelation purely originating from the jihn and the Qurash but the typology of duality and its likeness to the other prophets in the Abrahamic line affirms his revelation. This likeness is found in the complexity of its structure and its message of submission of faith to the one God, Allah. This also revels that his revelation comes from God alone and he is the preserver of the Straight Path as well as the inspired messages and lives of other prophets, making the Quran cohesive with the monotheistic reality in the Abrahamic traditions.

Known prophets

Prophets and messengers named in the Quran 
All messengers mentioned in the Quran are also prophets, but not all prophets are messengers.

Figures whose prophethood is debated 

To believe in God's messengers (Rusul) means to be convinced that God sent men as guides to fellow human beings and jinn (khalq) to guide them to the truth.

Other persons 
The Quran mentions 25 prophets by name but also tells that God sent many other prophets and messengers, to all the different nations that have existed on Earth. Many verses in the Quran discuss this:
 "We did aforetime send messengers before thee: of them, there are some whose story We have related to thee, and some whose story We have not related to thee...."
 "For We assuredly sent amongst every People a messenger, ..."

In the Quran 
 Sons of Jacob: These men are sometimes not considered to be prophets, although most exegesis scholars consider them to be prophets, citing the hadith of Muhammad and their status as prophets in Judaism. The reason that some do not consider them as prophets is because of their behavior with Yusuf (Joseph) and that they lied to their father. 
 Three persons of the town: These three unnamed person, who were sent to the same town, are referenced in chapter 36 of the Quran.

In Islamic literature 
Numerous other people have been mentioned by scholars in the Hadith, exegesis, commentary. These people include:

Other groups

Prophethood in Ahmadiyya 

The Ahmadiyya Community does not believe that messengers and prophets are different individuals. They interpret the Quranic words warner (nadhir), prophet, and messenger as referring to different roles that the same divinely appointed individuals perform. Ahmadiyya distinguish only between law-bearing prophets and non-law-bearing ones. They believe that although law-bearing prophethood ended with Muhammad, non-law-bearing prophethood subordinate to Muhammad continues. The Ahmadiyya Community recognizes Mirza Ghulam Ahmad (1835–1908) as a prophet of God and the promised Messiah and Imam Mahdi of the latter days. The Lahore Ahmadiyya Movement rejects his status as a prophet, instead considering him to be a renewer of the faith. However, all other Muslims and their scholars argue that the Ahmadiyya community are not Muslim.

Prophethood in Baháism 

In contrast to the Muslims, Baháʼís do not believe that Muhammad is the final messenger of God, or rather define eschatology and end times references as metaphorical for changes in the ages or eras of mankind but that it and progress of God's guidance continues. Although, in common with Islam, the title the Seal of the Prophets is reserved for Muhammad, Baháʼís interpret it differently. They believe that the term Seal of the Prophets applies to a specific epoch, and that each prophet is the "seal" of his own epoch. Therefore, in the sense that all the prophets of God are united in the same "Cause of God", having the same underlying message, and all "abiding in the same tabernacle, soaring in the same heaven, seated upon the same throne, uttering the same speech, and proclaiming the same Faith", they can all claim to be "the return of all the Prophets".

See also

References

Citations

Sources

External links 

 First prophet of islam: adam aleh salam
 Prophets in Islam